Ferdinand Herbord Ivar, Prince of Bismarck (German: Ferdinand Herbord Ivar Fürst von Bismarck; 22 November 1930 – 23 July 2019) was a German lawyer and landowner from the family of statesman Otto von Bismarck. He was the head of the princely branch of the House of Bismarck.

Background and career

He was born in London, the son of politician and diplomat Otto Christian Archibald von Bismarck and Swedish socialite Ann-Mari Tengbom. He was a grandson of statesman Herbert von Bismarck, a great-grandson of statesman Otto von Bismarck, and the maternal grandson of the prominent Swedish architect Ivar Tengbom. 

He grew up in London and Rome where his father worked as a diplomat. When his father was released from the foreign service because of his contacts with the resistance group in November 1944, Ferdinand was sent to Sweden and did not return to Germany until 1947. He was then educated at the Schule Schloss Salem boarding school. After a few years in Brazil in the early 1950s, where he worked for the German–Brazilian Chamber of Commerce, he went on to study law, earning a law degree in 1956. He worked for the European Commission in Brussels for some years, and after 1967 worked as an attorney in Hamburg, based from his home in Friedrichsruh, the estate granted to his grandfather by Emperor William I. Bismarck was a member of the board of the Otto von Bismarck Foundation and was patron of the Bismarckbund and the Bismarck Order, as well as chairman of the Duchy of Lauenburg Foundation.

He managed his family's estate there, including the Sachsenwald, a forest of 6,000 hectares near Hamburg. He sold parts of the forest as building land, like his father had done, and purchased farm land in Uruguay which he later sold. He also invested in Marbella, Spain, where he was a notable member of the Marbella Club. He founded the „Marbella Hill Club“, a settlement of luxurious villas, and also acquired the „Park Palace“, a huge tenement building in Monte Carlo. From 1989, he sold 2,250 hectares of the Sachsenwald to the shipowner Eberhart von Rantzau, owner of the Deutsche Afrika-Linien, retaining 4,500 hectares to his own. Bismarck died in a hospital in Reinbek, at the age of 88.

Family life
Bismarck married the Belgian Elisabeth Lippens in 1960; she was a daughter of Count Léon Lippens and a granddaughter of the Belgian politician Count Maurice Lippens. They had four children:
Carl-Eduard, Prince von Bismarck-Schönhausen 16 February 1961), was briefly a Member of the Bundestag, the German parliament;
 Count Alexei von Bismarck-Schönhausen
 Countess Grace 
Count Gottfried von Bismarck-Schönhausen (1962–2007); 
Count Gregor von Bismarck-Schönhausen (1964)
Countess Marina (born 1986)
 Heidi Swindle
 Otto Swindle
Count Léon (born 2002)
Count Otis (born 2007)
Countess Wilhelmina (born 2009)
Countess Vanessa von Bismarck-Schönhausen (1971). Vanessa graduated from the London School of Economics and runs a public relations firm in New York.
Laszlo Weiner
Cosmo Weiner
Bismarck had the nominal title of Count of Bismarck-Schönhausen from his birth until the death of his father in 1975, when he succeeded to the title of Prince. He was succeeded by his oldest son Carl von Bismarck in accordance with letters patent of 1871.

He was a godfather of King Willem-Alexander of the Netherlands who also attended his funeral at Friedrichsruh. Ferdinand had been a college friend of Prince Claus at a young age when they studied law together in Hamburg. The later Queen Beatrix and Prince Claus also chose him as groomsman for their wedding in 1966. Among the visitors of Friedrichsruh were also the kings Carl XVI Gustaf of Sweden and Juan Carlos I of Spain with their wives, as well as the Duke and Duchess of Windsor.

Publications
 Anmerkungen eines Patrioten ("Observations of a Patriot"), 1998
 Setzen wir Deutschland wieder in den Sattel ("Germany back in the Saddle"), 2004

Ancestry

References

External links
"Innocence In Danger Gala" , Life
"Innocence In Danger Art For Children Charity Gala", Wire Image, 26 April 2008, Berlin, Germany

Ferdinand
1930 births
2019 deaths
Ferdinand Von
Alumni of Schule Schloss Salem
German people of Swedish descent